The list of ecoregions in Illinois are lists of terrestrial ecoregions (see also, ecosystem) of the United States' State of Illinois, as defined separately by the United States Environmental Protection Agency (USEPA), and by the World Wildlife Fund.

USEPA
The EPA ecoregion classification system has four levels, but only Levels I, III, and IV are shown on this list. Level I divides North America into 15 broad ecoregions (or biomes).  Illinois is almost entirely within the Eastern Temperate Forest environment Level I region, although very small sections in its extreme west are in the Great Plains, Level I region.  Level IV ecoregions (denoted by numbers and letters) are a further subdivision of Level III ecoregions  (denoted by numbers alone).  In general, Illinois transitions from the forests, to savannah, to tall grass prairie, and is now largely used for agriculture or urbanized, although in its far south are the forested highlands of the Shawnee Hills and along its major rivers varying topography and biome occurs.  Its larger ecoregion areas are 'corn belt' plains, known for rich, thick loess (in its north, center and east, particularly 54a) and the 'rivers and hills' region, which also has large till plains in Illinois' south (72j) and west (72i).

Great Plains
40 Central Irregular Plains (small section in the west)
40a - Loess Flats and Till Plains
47 Western Corn Belt Plains (small section in the west)
47f - Rolling Loess Prairies

Eastern Temperate Forest
These forests stretch from eastern Texas and northern Florida to the Adirondacks and Wisconsin. For a general description of these forests, refer to Temperate Deciduous Forest.  The standard reference is The Deciduous Forest of Eastern North America.
52 Driftless Area (far northwestern Illinois)
52a - Savanna Section
52b - Paleozoic Plateau/Coulee Section
53 Southeastern Wisconsin Till Plains (northern Illinois)
53a -  Rock River Drift Plain
53b - Kettle Moraines
54 Central Corn Belt Plains (northern and central Illinois)
54a - Illinois/Indiana Prairies
54b - Chicago Lake Plain
54c - Kankakee Marsh
54d - Sand Area
54e - Chiwaukee Prairie Region
54f -  Valparaiso-Wheaton Morainal Complex
54g - Rock River Hills
71 Interior Plateau (far southern Illinois)
71a - Crawford-Mammoth Cave Uplands
71m - Northern Shawnee Hills
71n - Southern Shawnee Hills
72 Interior River Valleys and Hills (along the State boundary rivers and into the interior along the Illinois River, also the broad somewhat hillier southern and western till plains)
72a - Wabash-Ohio Bottomlands
72b - Glaciated Wabash Lowlands
72d - Upper Mississippi Alluvial Plain
72e - Middle Mississippi Alluvial Plain
72f - River Hills
72g - Southern Ozarkian River Bluffs
72i - Western Dissected Illinoian Till Plain
72j - Southern Illinoian Till Plain
72k - Cretaceous Hills
72l - Karstic Northern Ozarkian River Bluffs
72m - Wabash River Bluffs and Low Hills
73 Mississippi Alluvial Plain (extreme southern Illinois)
73a - Northern Holocene Meander Belts
73c - St. Francis Lowlands

World Wildlife Fund

See also
Geography of Illinois
Climate of Illinois
Geology of Illinois
Fauna of Illinois
Illinois Natural History Survey
List of ecoregions in the United States (EPA)
List of ecoregions in the United States (WWF)
List of National Natural Landmarks in Illinois

References

Further reading
 Ricketts, Taylor H; Eric Dinerstein; David M. Olson; Colby J. Loucks; et al. (1999). Terrestrial Ecoregions of North America: a Conservation Assessment. Island Press; Washington, DC

External links
 Illinois Ecoregions Report from the EPA

Illinois
Environment of Illinois
Illinois geography-related lists
Illinois
United States science-related lists